Trebanjski Vrh is a settlement in the Municipality of Trebnje in eastern Slovenia. The area is part of the historical region of Lower Carniola. The municipality is now included in the Southeast Slovenia Statistical Region.

Mass grave
Trebanjski Vrh is the site of a mass grave from the period immediately after the Second World War. The Roje Cave 1 Mass Grave is located along the road between Roje pri Čatežu and Čatež. The Yugoslav secret police (OZNA) arrested them in the first few months after the war and murdered them in the cave.

Church

The local church is dedicated to Saint Bartholomew and belongs to the Parish of Čatež-Zaplaz. It is a Gothic building, with 17th- and 18th-century additions.

References

External links
Trebanjski Vrh at Geopedia

Populated places in the Municipality of Trebnje